The Audio and Radio Industry Awards (ARIAS, ARIAs, or UK ARIAs) are annual awards awarded for excellence in UK radio and audio presenting and production. Established in 2016 by the Radio Academy, they succeeded the Radio Academy Awards, the academy's honours system of 1983 to 2014 (there were no awards for 2015). They are awarded for productions in the previous calendar year. In contrast to many other media award ceremonies, three winners are selected by judging panels for each category and graded Gold, Silver or Bronze.

In May 2019 the Young ARIAs were inaugurated at the BBC Radio Theatre in London in a ceremony hosted by BBC Radio 1's Matt Edmondson and Kiss FM host Daisy Maskell. The very next year they were rebranded as the Young Audio Awards.

Notable omissions 
Since their launch, the Audio and Radio Industry Awards have been shunned by the biggest commercial radio group in the UK, Global Radio. Although the Radio Academy is not supported by Global Radio this does not preclude it from entering programmes or presenters from its stations, namely Heart, Capital, LBC, Capital Xtra, Classic FM, Smooth Radio, Radio X or Gold.

ARIAs 2016 
Nominations for the 16 inaugural award categories were unveiled on 19 September 2016 by Radio 1's Scott Mills and Pandora Christie of Kiss FM. The shortlist for each category was limited to five nominees.

ARIAs 2017 
Nominations were revealed on 18 September 2017 by Virgin Radio presenters Kate Lawler and Matt Richardson. The number of categories was increased to 23, each with a shortlist of six nominees.

ARIAs 2018
Nominations were revealed on 17 September 2018 by Capital South Wales presenters Matt Lissack and Polly James. New categories introduced this year included Best Local Radio Show, Funniest Show, Best Commercial Promotion and Best Station Sound.

ARIAs 2019
Fallow year (no awards ceremony was held in 2019).

ARIAs 2020
The awards ceremony was moved to a spring slot from its traditional autumn fixture and took place at The London Palladium. Nominations were revealed on 15 January 2020.

ARIAs 2021
The nominees were announced on 21 April 2021. Due to COVID-19 restrictions the 2021 awards ceremony was an hybrid event with just 100 invited guests in a small theatre at The May Fair Hotel. In recognition of content produced to support audiences in lockdown, new categories included The Creative Innovation Award, The Impact Award and The 2020 Special Award.

ARIAs 2022
The nominees were announced on 5 April 2022. The awards ceremony was once again a live in-person event after the lifting of COVID-19 restrictions.

References

External links
 

 
British radio awards
2016 establishments in the United Kingdom
Awards established in 2016